The Sharlot Hall Museum is an open-air museum and heritage site located in Prescott, Arizona.  Opened in 1928 by Sharlot M. Hall as the Gubernatorial Mansion Museum, the museum that now bears her name is dedicated to preserving the history and culture of the Central Highlands of Arizona.

Overview
The museum grounds comprises almost four acres and includes 11 exhibit buildings, six of which are historic.  This includes the Governor's Mansion built at its site in 1864 and listed in the National Register of Historic Places (NRHP).  Several historic buildings and structures were moved to the property, and include:
 Fort Misery (the oldest log cabin in Arizona, built in 1864, moved to this property in 1934),
 Frémont House (built in 1875, home of 5th Territorial governor John C. Frémont, moved to the museum in 1971),
 Bashford House (built in 1877 and was the Victorian home of businessman William Bashford).
Additional historic buildings built on-site include the Sharlot Hall Building (stone exhibit building built during the Depression as a CWA project) and the nearby Ranch House.

Additional exhibit buildings include the Lawler Exhibit Center, built in the 1970s which houses the museum's pre-history exhibit; the Transportation Building, built in 1937 and houses the museum's rolling stock; and the School House, built as a replica to the first school house built in Prescott in 1868.

Sharlot Hall Museum also has a Library and Archives, located across the street at 115 S. McCormick Street.  It provides full-service research opportunities through its vast collections of rare books and special holdings of original documents, photographs, maps, and oral histories.

History

Old Governor's Mansion
The Old Governor's Mansion was built in 1864 and was listed on the National Register of Historic Places in 1971.

It was built at a cost of $6,000 by contractors were Blair, Hatz, and Raible, who reportedly underestimated the cost of transporting building materials and lost
$1,500 on the contract.

In front of the mansion are roses, of French "Boursault" type, descended from 1865 planting by Margaret McCormick, wife of the 2nd governor of the Arizona Territory (see photo including informational plaque).

Images
Images of some historic structures and exhibits in the Sharlot Hall Museum:

See also
 Pauline Weaver, mountain man who is buried on the grounds

References

External links

 Official website
 Sharlot Hall Museum Library & Archives
 
 

Houses on the National Register of Historic Places in Arizona
Organizations established in 1928
Open-air museums in Arizona
Museums in Prescott, Arizona
Museums established in 1928
1928 establishments in Arizona
Government buildings on the National Register of Historic Places in Arizona
Houses in Yavapai County, Arizona
National Register of Historic Places in Prescott, Arizona
Buildings and structures completed in 1864